Angst is a 2001 "erotic mysticism novel with a detective plot" by Oleg Postnov —a work that transgresses the genres, and yet the critics discern a panoply of literary and philosophical influences in the novel. The critics have claimed that Angst builds on the tradition of Pushkin's Queen of Spades, Gogol's (Russian: Вий and even on the writings of Jorge Luis Borges[8] Of course, the longer the list of the claimed influences, the more one questions the degree of any of the influences. Postnov's Angst took the first prize in the "Catch of 1999" Russian nationwide competition.[9]

Plot
A story of love of a Russian youth and a Ukrainian beauty is set in the deep Ukrainian country in 1991. Postnov's insightful treatment of the political and ethnographic background of that year became freshly relevant in 2014, when Ukraine's renewed struggle for territorial integrity captivated the world's attention again.

Awards and recognitions
Postnov's Angst took the first prize in the "Catch of 1999" Russian nationwide competition was nominated for the Russian Booker Prize of 2002; for the National Bestseller Prize; and shortlisted for the prestigious Apollon Grigoriev Prize.

Critical reception
The critics have described Postnov's work as an amalgamation of the Russian's classics—"as if [Vladimir] Nabokov took on a rewrite of Gogol's Evenings on a Farm Near Dikanka—with the added "macabre of Edgar Allan Poe." The critics have claimed that Angst builds on the tradition of Pushkin's Queen of Spades, Gogol's  and even on the writings of Jorge Luis Borges In Germany, where the critics took Angst to be Postnov's literary debut, Die Berliner Literaturktitik compared the book to Nabokov's Lolita and called Postnov a "magician."

External links
 Excerpt from the Novel, Oleg Postnov, the official website

References

2001 novels